Mark Burgess (born 1960) is a British playwright and actor who appeared in Brookside as Gordon Collins.  Burgess wrote and performed the one-man show The Man with the Golden Pen on the life of Ian Fleming.

Selected works
Casting Shadows, centred on a discussion between Max Miller, Laurence Olivier and Terence Rattigan in 1962 (1999)
The Man with the Golden Pen (original title: Fleming's Bond), one-man play about Ian Fleming (2000)
Einstein in Cromer, with David Suchet in the title role about Albert Einstein's stay in a small hut on Roughton Heath (2004)
From Father with Love, on Ian Fleming's relationship with his son Caspar (2006)
Sam O'Bedlam, centred on Samuel Beckett, played by Jim Norton (2006)
The Wrong Hero, on the wartime life and death of Leslie Howard (2008)
A King's Speech, on Lionel Logue and George VI (2009)
Tales from Tate Modern, (A Modern Love Story) BBC Radio 4 Short Story(2010
Two Halves Of Guinness Stage Play (2011)
Eel Pie Island short story BBC radio 4 (2012)
The Only Way, a one-act play to commemorate Bedford Modern School's 10 years of co-education, starring Chris Edge and Elsa Keep (2013)
With Wings as Eagles, a play celebrating 250 years of Bedford Modern School, starring Gregor Copeland

References

External links
 

Living people
British dramatists and playwrights
British male television actors
1960 births
British male dramatists and playwrights